Akram Hossain Chowdhury is a Bangladesh Awami League politician and the former Member of Parliament from Naogaon-3.

Career
Chowdhury was elected to Parliament from Naogaon-3 on 2008 as a Bangladesh Awami League candidate.

References

Awami League politicians
Living people
9th Jatiya Sangsad members
Year of birth missing (living people)
People from Naogaon District